The Apers are a Dutch pop punk band who formed in Rotterdam in 1996. They have released their first three albums on Stardumb Records, then released their 2007 album Reanimate My Heart on Sonic Rendezvous Records in Europe, and Insubordination Records in the USA, before moving on to Asian Man Records. They have played about 700 shows all over Europe and the USA. The band is often compared to Screeching Weasel, not lastly because of frontman Kevin Aper's snotty vocal delivery, reminiscent of Ben Weasel.

Discography

Studio albums
The Apers - 2001
The Buzz Electric - 2003
Skies Are Turning Blue - 2005
Reanimate My Heart - 2007	
You Are Only as Strong as the Table You Dance On - 2009
Confetti on the Floor - 2014

Live albums
Live at the Eldorado - 2012

Compilations
The Wild & Savage Apers - 2004
Still Cruisin' After All These Beers - 2010

Splits
Retarded/Apers - 2005
20 Belows/Apers - 2008
Apers/Sons Of Buddha - 2011
The Riptides & The Apers - What About The Monster - 2013

EPs
Teenage Drama Every Kid Will Understand - 2000

Singles
Eyes Open Wide - 2001

Band members
Current members:
Kevin Aper - vocals, bass guitar
Ivo Backbreaker - drums
Michael Stoel - guitars

Past members:
Jerry Hormone - guitars, backing vocals (2000–2005)
Marien Nicotine - guitars, backing vocals (1996–2007)
Kelvin Centerfold - guitars (2005-2010)

References

External links
The Apers official website

Pop punk groups
Dutch punk rock groups
Asian Man Records artists